José Guterres Silva (born 24 April 1998), is a football player who currently plays as for Timor-Leste national football team.

International career
Guterres Silva made his senior international debut in an 8-0 loss against United Arab Emirates national football team in the 2018 FIFA World Cup qualification on 12 November 2015.

References

1998 births
Living people
East Timorese footballers
Timor-Leste international footballers
Association football defenders
Footballers at the 2014 Asian Games
Footballers at the 2018 Asian Games
Asian Games competitors for East Timor
Competitors at the 2019 Southeast Asian Games
Southeast Asian Games competitors for East Timor